Assiniboine Corridor Wildlife Management Area is a wildlife management area located along the Assiniboine River, Manitoba, Canada. It was established in 2000 under the Manitoba Wildlife Act.

See also
 List of wildlife management areas in Manitoba
 List of protected areas of Manitoba

References

External links
 Assiniboine Corridor Wildlife Management Area
 iNaturalist: Assiniboine Corridor Wildlife Management Area

Protected areas established in 2000
Wildlife management areas of Manitoba
Protected areas of Manitoba